Darker Than Midnight is a 2014 Italian drama film directed by Sebastiano Riso and starring Vincenzo Amato and Micaela Ramazzotti. It was screened as part of the International Critics' Week section at the 2014 Cannes Film Festival.

Cast

 Vincenzo Amato as Massimo
 Micaela Ramazzotti as Rita
 Davide Capone as Davide 
 Lucia Sardo as Davide's Grandmother

Accolades

References

External links
 

2014 films
2010s coming-of-age drama films
Coming-of-age films based on actual events
2010s English-language films
Films set in Sicily
2010s French-language films
Italian coming-of-age drama films
2010s Italian-language films
Italian LGBT-related films
LGBT-related drama films
2014 directorial debut films
2014 drama films
2014 LGBT-related films
2010s Italian films